Lumberton is a city in Robeson County, North Carolina, United States. As of 2020, its population was 19,025. It is the seat of Robeson County's government.

Located in southern North Carolina's Inner Banks region, Lumberton is located on the Lumber River. It was founded in 1787 by John Willis, an officer in the American Revolution. This was developed as a shipping point for lumber used by the Navy, and logs were guided downriver to Georgetown, South Carolina. Most of the town's growth took place after World War II.

History
Robeson County, North Carolina, was formed in 1787. General John Willis, owner of the Red Banks plantation, lobbied to have the county's new seat of government located on his land. The site of Lumberton was chosen due to its central location in the county, proximity to a reliable ford of the Lumber River, and as it was where several roads intersected. Willis turned over 170 acres, which were surveyed and disbursed in a lottery held under the auspices of the county court on August 14, 1787. As the site was heavily forested, trees were felled to make way for a courthouse, business and residential lots, streets, a commons, and a public square. The first courthouse was a wooden residence sold by Willis to the county and moved into place after the land was clear. Lumberton was formally created by an act of the North Carolina General Assembly on November 3, 1788, which granted the town a charter and the power to levy taxes. The community was named in homage to the Lumber River.

Aside from the courthouse, the first buildings in Lumberton were a handful of brick structures built near the river, which included a hotel, stores, and warehouses, which were stocked by goods sent up the river from Georgetown, South Carolina. The community's first school was established by Willis in 1791. The town had a post office by 1796. It was formally incorporated in 1852 and granted a municipal government with a mayor and a board of commissioners. The town was connected by rail with Wilmington in 1860, which reduced its reliance on river trade from Georgetown. Much of the business district was burnt down in a fire in 1870 and another in 1876.

For four seasons, 1947–50, Lumberton fielded a professional minor-league baseball team in the Tobacco State League. Affiliated with the Chicago Cubs, the team was known as the Lumberton Cubs in 1947 and '48, and the Lumberton Auctioneers in 1949 and '50.

In 1970, Lumberton was named an All-American City, presented by the National Civic League. Many businesses left the downtown in the mid-1970s. A 1988 hostage crisis at the offices of The Robesonian and the 1993 murder of James R. Jordan Sr. nearby generated a negative national image for the city. In 1995, the city won the All-American City award a second time.

In 2016, Robeson County was impacted by Hurricane Matthew, leading to record flooding in Lumberton. In 2018, the county was struck by Hurricane Florence, which broke the flooding record. As a result of extensive damage to homes, entire streets in south and west Lumberton were left abandoned.

The Baker Sanatorium, Luther Henry Caldwell House, Carolina Theatre, Humphrey-Williams Plantation, Lumberton Commercial Historic District, Planters Building, Robeson County Agricultural Building, Alfred Rowland House, and US Post Office-Lumberton are listed on the National Register of Historic Places.

Geography
The town lies within the Carolina Border Belt, a regional network of tobacco markets and warehouses along both sides of the North Carolina-South Carolina border.

According to the United States Census Bureau, the city has a total area of 15.8 square miles (40.9 km2), of which 0.1 sq mi (0.2 km2) (0.44%) is covered by water.

Lumberton is located on the Lumber River in the state's Coastal Plains region. The Lumber River State Park,  of natural and scenic waterway, flows through Lumberton.

Lumberton is served by Interstate 95 and Interstate 74.

Climate
Lumberton experiences a humid subtropical climate with hot, humid summers and cool winters.

Demographics

Lumberton is the larger principal city of the Lumberton-Laurinburg combined statistical area that includes the Lumberton (Robeson County) and Laurinburg (Scotland County) micropolitan areas, which had a combined population of 159,337 at the 2000 census.

2020 census

As of the 2020 United States census, 19,025 people, 7,142 households, and 4,536 families resided in the city.

2010 census
As of the 2010 United States Census, 21,542 people were living in the city. The racial makeup of the city was 39.0% White, 36.7% Black, 12.7% Native American, 2.4% Asian, 0.1% Pacific Islander, 0.1% from some other race, and 2.2% from two or more races. About 6.7% were Hispanic or Latino of any race.

2000 census
As of the census of 2000, 20,795 people, 7,827 households and 5,165 families were residing in Lumberton. The population density was 1,322.4 people per square mile (510.8/km2). The 8,800 housing units had an average density of 559.6 per square mile (216.1/km2). The racial makeup of the city was 48.54% White, 35.44% African American, 12.79% Native American, 0.91% Asian, 1.21% from other races, and 1.11% from two or more races. Hispanicss or Latinoss of any race were 3.30% of the population.

Of the 7,827 households, 32.2% had children under 18 living with them; 38.8% were married couples living together; 23.0% had a female householder with no husband present, and 34.0% were not families. About 29.9% of all households were made up of individuals, and 12.6% had someone living alone who was 65 or older. The average household size was 2.44, and the average family size was 3.01. Children of high-school age (grades 9–12) attend Lumberton High School, which is run by the Public Schools of Robeson County, as it is in Robeson County.

The city's age distribution was 26.3% under 18; 9.3% from 18 to 24; 28.2% from 25 to 44; 21.3% from 45 to 64; and 14.8% who were 65 or older. The median age was 35 years. For every 100 females, there were 89.1 males. For every 100 females 18 and over, there were 85.8 males.

The median income for a household in Lumberton was $26,782, and for a family was $33,839. Males had a median income of $28,903 versus $24,503 for females. The per capita income for the city was $15,504. About 23.9% of families and 25.9% of the population were below the poverty line, including 38.4% of those under age 18 and 23.7% of those age 65 or over.

Government 

Lumberton is headed by a council–manager government. The city supplies electric utility services to its residents.

Education
Public Schools of Robeson County operates public schools.

Notable people
 Angus Wilton McLean (1870–1935) served as 56th governor of North Carolina from 1925 to 1929.
 Brad Allen, a NFL referee
 Velma Barfield (1932–1984), a serial killer who murdered six people, was born in South Carolina and a Lumberton resident.
 Benjamin Crump (born 1969), an American civil-rights attorney
 Brad Edwards (born 1966) is a former defensive back for the NFL's Minnesota Vikings, Washington Redskins, and Atlanta Falcons, and director of athletics at George Mason University.
 Hunter Foster (born 1969), a Tony Award-nominated actor
 Penny Fuller (born 1940), a film, television, and Broadway actress, moved to Lumberton at age 12.
 Tommy Greene (born 1967), Major League Baseball pitcher
 Carmen Hart, pornographic film actress and erotic dancer
 Dr. Johnny Hunt, elected president of Southern Baptist Convention in 2008
 Dennis F. Kinlaw, academic, president of Asbury University; author of Christian theological works
 Vonta Leach (born 1981), fullback for NFL's Baltimore Ravens
 Ashton Locklear (born 1998), gymnast
 Gene Locklear (born 1949), Major League Baseball outfielder
 Sean Locklear (born 1981), football offensive tackle
 Dwight Lowry (1957–1997), Major League Baseball player for Detroit Tigers and Minnesota Twins
 Mike McIntyre (born 1956), U.S. Representative of North Carolina's 7th Congressional District from 1997 to 2015, also practiced law in city prior to election to Congress
 M. Warley Platzek (1854–1932), lawyer and New York Supreme Court Justice
 Afeni Shakur (1947–2016), prominent member of Black Panther Party and mother of rapper Tupac Shakur
 John Small (1946–2012), linebacker with NFL's Atlanta Falcons and Detroit Lions
 Ida Van Smith (1917–2003), pilot and flight instructor
 Jamain Stephens (born 1974), NFL offensive tackle for Pittsburgh Steelers and Cincinnati Bengals
 Donnell Thompson (born 1958), NFL defensive end
Betty Rose Wishart (born 1947), composer
 Tim Worley (born 1966), former running back for the Georgia Bulldogs and NFL's Pittsburgh Steelers and Chicago Bears

References

Works cited

External links

 Official website of Lumberton, NC
 Lumberton Area Chamber of Commerce
 Lumberton Visitors Bureau
 Online News for Lumberton (www.lumbertontimes.com)

Cities in North Carolina
Cities in Robeson County, North Carolina
County seats in North Carolina
Populated places established in 1787
1787 establishments in North Carolina